In the mathematical field of graph theory, the Folkman graph is a 4-regular graph with 20 vertices and 40 edges. It is a regular bipartite graph with symmetries taking every edge to every other edge, but the two sides of its bipartition are not symmetric with each other, making it the smallest possible semi-symmetric graph. It is named after Jon Folkman, who constructed it for this property in 1967.

The Folkman graph can be constructed either using modular arithmetic or as the subdivided double of the five-vertex complete graph. Beyond the investigation of its symmetry, it has also been investigated as a counterexample for certain questions of graph embedding.

Construction
Semi-symmetric graphs are defined as regular graphs (that is, graphs in which all vertices touch equally many edges) in which each two edges are symmetric to each other, but some two vertices are not symmetric. Jon Folkman was inspired to define and research these graphs in a 1967 paper, after seeing an unpublished manuscript by E. Dauber and Frank Harary which gave examples of graphs meeting the symmetry condition but not the regularity condition. Folkman's original construction of this graph was a special case of a more general construction of semi-symmetric graphs using modular arithmetic, based on a prime number  congruent to 1 mod 4. For each such prime, there is a number  such that  mod , and Folkman uses modular arithmetic to construct a semi-symmetric graph with  vertices.

Another construction for the Folkman graph begins with the complete graph on five vertices, . The ten subdivision vertices form one side of the bipartition of the Folkman graph, and the ten vertices in twin pairs coming from the doubled vertices of  form the other side of the bipartition.

However, there also exist larger 4-regular semi-symmetric graphs that do not have any twin vertices.

Algebraic properties
This group acts transitively on the Folkman graph's edges (it includes a symmetry taking any edge to any other edge) but not on its vertices. The Folkman graph is the smallest undirected graph that is edge-transitive and regular, but not vertex-transitive. Such graphs are called semi-symmetric graphs and were first studied by Folkman in 1967 who discovered the  graph on 20 vertices that now is named after him.

Like all semi-symmetric graphs, the Folkman graph is bipartite. Its automorphism group includes symmetries taking any vertex to any other vertex that is on the same side of the bipartition, but none that take a vertex to the other side of the bipartition. Every symmetry maps a doubled pair of vertices to another doubled pair of vertices, but there is no grouping of the subdivision vertices that is preserved by the symmetries.

Other properties

The Folkman graph has a Hamiltonian cycle, and more strongly a Hamiltonian decomposition into two Hamiltonian cycles. Like every bipartite graph, its chromatic number is two, and its chromatic index (the minimum number of colors needed to color its edges so that no two edges of the same color meet at a vertex) equals its maximum degree, which in this case is four. For instance, such a coloring can be obtained by using two colors in alternation for each cycle of a Hamiltonian decomposition.

Its radius is 3 and its diameter is 4. However, there are pairs of subdivision vertices from the construction (coming from disjoint edges of ) that are four steps apart from each other. Because the graph contains many 4-cycles, its girth is 4, the minimum possible for a bipartite graph. It is also 4-vertex-connected and 4-edge-connected. Its treewidth and clique-width are both 5.

The Folkman graph has genus 3: it can be embedded on a triple torus, but not on any simpler oriented surface. It has book thickness 3, but requires five pages for a "dispersable" book embedding in which each page is a matching, disproving a conjecture of Frank Bernhart and Paul Kainen that dispersable book embeddings of regular graphs need only a number of pages equal to their degree.

References 

Individual graphs
Regular graphs